The men's 200-metre freestyle competition of the swimming events at the 1983 Pan American Games took place on 17 August. The last Pan American Games champion was Rowdy Gaines of the US.

This race consisted of four lengths of the pool, all performed in freestyle.

Results
All times are in minutes and seconds.

Heats

Final 
The final was held on August 17.

References

Swimming at the 1983 Pan American Games